The 2019–20 Kategoria Superiore was the 81st official season, or 84th season of top-tier football in Albania (including three unofficial championships during World War II) and the 20th season under the name Kategoria Superiore. The season began on 23 August 2019 and ended on 29 July 2020. Tirana, won the league title on 19 July 2020 with 2 matches to spare.

The winners of this season's Kategoria Superiore earned a place in the first qualifying round of the 2020-21 Champions League, with the second and third placed clubs earning a place in the first qualifying round of the 2020-21 Europa League. The competition was suspended from 12 March to 3 June 2020, due to a pandemic of COVID-19 in Albania.

Teams
Two clubs earned promotion from the Kategoria e Parë, Bylis and Vllaznia. Kastrioti was relegated to Kategoria e Parë at the conclusion of last season, Kamza was excluded from the championship and relegated to the Kategoria e Dytë, after a violent incident during a match against Laçi in the 24th round.

Locations

Stadiums

Personnel and kits

Note: Flags indicate national team as has been defined under FIFA eligibility rules. Players and Managers may hold more than one non-FIFA nationality.

Managerial changes

League table

Results
Clubs will play each other four times for a total of 36 matches each.

First half of season

Second half of season

Relegation play-off

Both clubs remained in their respective leagues.

Season statistics

Scoring

Top scorers

Discipline

Player 
 Most yellow cards: 14
 Albano Aleksi (Teuta)

 Most red cards: 2
 Agustín Torassa (Tirana)
 Blagoja Todorovski (Teuta)
 Donald Mëllugja (Bylis)
 Fabian Beqja (Teuta)
 Erion Hoxhallari (Tirana)
 Theophilus Solomon (Partizani)
 Valdo Zeqaj (Flamurtari)

See also
 Kategoria Superiore

References

External links
 
Kategoria Superiore at uefa.com

2019-20
Albania
1
Association football events postponed due to the COVID-19 pandemic